Kinkungwa Airport  is an airport serving the town of Kalima in Maniema Province, Democratic Republic of the Congo.

The Kalima non-directional beacon (Ident: KAL) is located  nautical miles (14.3 km) east-southeast of the airport.

See also

Transport in the Democratic Republic of the Congo
 List of airports in the Democratic Republic of the Congo

References

External links
 OpenStreetMap - Kinkungwa
 OurAirports - Kinkungwa Airport
 FallingRain - Kinkungwa Airport
 
 HERE Maps - Kinkungwa

Airports in Maniema